John Alberto Leguizamo Peláez (born July 22, 196013:04) is an American actor, comedian, and film producer. He has appeared in over 100 films, produced over 20 films and documentaries, made over 30 television appearances, and has produced various television projects. He's also written and performed for the Broadway stage receiving three Tony Award nominations for Freak in 1998, Sexaholix in 2002, and Latin History for Morons in 2018. He received a Special Tony Award in 2018.

He rose to fame with a co-starring role in Super Mario Bros. (1993) as Luigi, Benny Blanco in the crime drama Carlito's Way (1993), and later To Wong Foo, Thanks for Everything! Julie Newmar (1995), for which he received a Golden Globe Award for Best Supporting Actor nomination. Other films include Romeo + Juliet (1996), A Brother's Kiss (1997), Summer of Sam (1999), Moulin Rouge! (2001), The Alibi (2006), Righteous Kill (2008), Repo Men (2010), The Counselor (2013), John Wick (2014), and The Menu (2022). He served as the narrator of the sitcom The Brothers García (2000–2004) and voiced Sid the Sloth in the Ice Age franchise (2002–2016), and as Bruno in Encanto (2021).

Leguizamo is also known for his television roles including Freak (1998) for which he received the Primetime Emmy Award for Outstanding Individual Performance in a Variety or Music Program. He received further Primetime Emmy Award nominations for the Paramount miniseries Waco (2018), and Netflix's limited series When They See Us (2019). He's also appeared on ER, The Kill Point, Bloodline, and The Mandalorian.

Early life
Leguizamo was born in Bogotá, Colombia, on July 22, 1960, the son of Luz Marina Peláez and Alberto Rudolfo Leguizamo. His father was once an aspiring film director and studied at Cinecittà, but eventually dropped out due to lack of finances. According to Leguizamo, his surname is of Basque origin and he has distant Basque roots.

Research by the genealogy show Finding Your Roots indicated that Leguizamo does not have Puerto Rican, Italian, and Lebanese ancestry, as he has sometimes stated. His family is Colombian, and a DNA test found that his genetic ancestry includes European (mostly Spanish), along with Indigenous and distant African roots. His paternal grandfather was a wealthy Colombian landowner, and his great-great-grandfather, Higinio Cualla, was Mayor of Bogotá for sixteen years in the late 1800s, and was considered an important modernizer of the city. Leguizamo had always declared that he was Puerto Rican on his father's side, which was one of the reasons he was selected as the Puerto Rican Day Parade Global Ambassador of the Arts, and marched in the parade on June 12, 2011. Going further back in time, it was determined that Leguizamo's maternal lineage includes the 16th-century Spanish conquistador Sebastián de Belalcázar, as well as Jerónimo Betuma, a 17th-century indigenous Colombian of noble birth.

When Leguizamo was a child, his family immigrated to New York City, where they lived in various neighborhoods in Queens, including Jackson Heights. He later credited growing up as one of the first Latino children in the neighborhood as formative in his acting ability: "It was tough. There were lots of fights. I would walk through a park and be attacked, and I had to defend myself all the time. But this helped me to become funny so that I wouldn't get hit." Leguizamo attended the Joseph Pulitzer Middle School (I.S.145) and later the Murry Bergtraum High School. As a student at Murry Bergtraum, he wrote comedy material and tested it on his classmates. He was voted "Most Talkative" by his classmates. After graduating from high school, he began his theater career as an undergraduate at NYU's Tisch School of the Arts, from which he eventually dropped out in favor of a career in stand-up comedy. Post-NYU, Leguizamo enrolled at LIU Post and at HB Studio, where he took theater classes.

Career

Early career
Leguizamo started out as a stand-up comic doing the New York nightclub circuit in 1984, and in 1987, he performed at The Public Theater in two shows, including as Puck in A Midsummer Night's Dream. He made his television debut in 1986 with a small part in Miami Vice. His other early roles include: a friend of Madonna's boyfriend in her "Borderline" video (1984); Mixed Blood (1985), Casualties of War (1989), a terrorist in Die Hard 2 (1990), Hangin' with the Homeboys (1991), the robber in Regarding Henry (1991), Super Mario Bros. (1993), and Night Owl (1993).

Film
In 1992, he starred in Whispers in the Dark as John Castillo. In 1993 Leguizamo was offered the lead part as Luigi in the film Super Mario Bros., based on the Mario video game franchise. Despite being considered a critical and financial failure universally, the film started his acting career in Hollywood and became one of his memorable roles. It also provided a boost to his career, allowing him to appear in better comedic roles in the following years. That same year, he had a prominent role in Brian De Palma's Carlito's Way as Carlito Brigante's nemesis, "Benny Blanco from the Bronx," which also boosted his career in serious roles.

Leguizamo also starred in Romeo + Juliet as Tybalt Capulet, as Violator in Spawn, Cholo in Land of the Dead, and Pestario 'Pest' Vargas in The Pest, the latter being one of his few roles as a lead actor in a studio film. In 1995, he starred as drag queen Chi-Chi Rodriguez in To Wong Foo, Thanks for Everything! Julie Newmar for which he received a Golden Globe Nomination for Best Supporting Actor, and starred in the 1996 action film Executive Decision as Captain Rat. In 2002, he starred in the movie Empire.
To promote the 2001 movie Moulin Rouge!, he appeared on a celebrity edition of the US version of Who Wants to Be a Millionaire? with Kelly Ripa, Kevin Sorbo, Alfre Woodard, Martin Short and Chevy Chase. Appearing as the first celebrity to sit in the hot seat, he eventually tried for $125,000, but got the answer wrong. Later in 2002, on the syndicated version, a question about the movie featured his character and Meredith Vieira mentioned that Leguizamo had played Lautrec and had been on the show.

In 2002, he voiced Sid the Sloth for the film Ice Age, reprising the role for the sequels Ice Age: The Meltdown, Ice Age: Dawn of the Dinosaurs, Ice Age: Continental Drift and Ice Age: Collision Course. The game versions of the films also used his voice. In 2003, he voice-acted Globox from Rayman 3: Hoodlum Havoc. Leguizamo portrayed Paul in the Brad Anderson thriller film Vanishing on 7th Street.
In 2007, he played Michael Beltran in the movie The Babysitters. In 2008, he co-starred in the movie The Happening, written and directed by M. Night Shyamalan. In 2014 Leguizamo starred alongside Jon Favreau in Chef as the line cook Martin, a role he prepared for by working as an actual line cook at The Lion in the West Village. Also in 2014, he played a drug dealer in the action comedy film American Ultra alongside Jesse Eisenberg and Kristen Stewart. He also starred in John Wick as Aurelio in 2014.

In October 2013, Leguizamo started filming for The Crash, starring alongside Frank Grillo, AnnaSophia Robb, Dianna Agron, Ed Westwick, Minnie Driver, Mary McCormack, Christopher McDonald and Maggie Q. The film is directed by Aram Rappaport and produced by Hilary Shor, Atit Shah and Aaron Becker. The Crash  was released on January 13, 2017. In 2021, Leguizamo provided the voice of Bruno Madrigal in the Disney animated film Encanto.

Television
In 1995, Leguizamo created, produced, wrote, and starred in the 1995 Latino-oriented variety show called House of Buggin' on Fox Television. Some audiences saw this as the Latino version of In Living Color. The show showcased Leguizamo's well-known ability to assume a wide variety of colorful, energetic characters, but due to poor ratings the show ran less than one season.

In 2000, Leguizamo portrayed both Genies in Arabian Nights, a TV mini-series adaptation of the epic One Thousand and One Nights.

During the 2005–06 television season, Leguizamo joined the cast of the show ER, playing the emotionally disturbed Dr. Victor Clemente, a new attending who is keen on introducing the staff of County General to better ways of treating patients and cutting-edge technology. Clemente, however, was plagued with personal problems and was fired from the hospital near the end of the season. Dr. Clemente's departure from the show was a blessing for Leguizamo. He revealed to CraveOnline that he was not happy working on the television program. "I was depressed doing ER," he admitted, "I started gaining weight, I was eating doughnuts, I started smoking again. I'm eating McDonald's, things that I know when I'm depressed I do. I tried to kill myself internally."

In 2004, he guest-starred on Dora the Explorer as Captain Pirate Piggy. In 2006, Leguizamo starred in the television pilot for Edison, a 2006 CBS drama about a Los Angeles detective (played by Leguizamo) who relied on impersonations and disguises to solve crimes. Other cast members included Currie Graham and Deidrie Henry. Kevin Rodney Sullivan directed from a script by Ron Milbauer and Terri Hughes. Leguizamo and David Hoberman also served as executive producers.

In July 2007, Spike TV aired its drama series The Kill Point, which starred Leguizamo, Donnie Wahlberg, and Michael Hyatt. The show was an eight-part series revolving around ex-war veterans whose bank robbery went wrong, thus ending in a hostage situation. Despite high ratings, The Kill Point was not renewed for a second season. A year later, Leguizamo guest-starred on Sesame Street as Captain Vegetable, who tells Elmo to eat his vegetables.

In 2010, Leguizamo also guest-starred on The Electric Company as himself, rhyming about commas and quotation marks. In 2012, Leguizamo was cast as Derek Trotter in the American remake of the British BBC sitcom Only Fools and Horses. In 2016, Leguizamo played the role of Ozzy Delvecchio in the second season of the Netflix original series Bloodline.

In 2018, Leguizamo played undercover ATF agent Jacob Vazquez in the Paramount Network miniseries Waco. The following year, Leguizamo played Raymond Santana's father Raymond Santana Sr. in the Netflix miniseries When They See Us. In 2020, Leguizamo played Gor Koresh in the Disney+ series The Mandalorian Season 2 Episode 1.

Broadway and theater
In 1991, Leguizamo also wrote and performed in the Off-Broadway production Mambo Mouth, where he played seven different characters. Mambo Mouth won an Obie Award and an Outer Critics Award. He was listed as one of 12 "Promising New Actors of 1991" in "John Willis' Screen Worlds Vol. 43".

In 1993, Leguizamo wrote and performed in Spic-O-Rama, where he made fun of the stereotyping of Latinos in the United States. The production won a Drama Desk Award and four Cable ACE Awards. Both Mambo Mouth and Spic-O-Rama were later filmed for presentation on HBO.

In 1998, he debuted on Broadway in the production of Freak, a semi-autobiographical one-person play that was filmed for HBO and released on October 10, 1998, with Spike Lee sitting in as director. The show won him the Drama Desk Award for Outstanding One-Person Show and the Primetime Emmy Award for Outstanding Individual Performance in a Variety or Music Program.

In 2002, he wrote and performed in Sexaholix... A Love Story, which explained his love life and how he started his own family.

In June 2010, Leguizamo opened his semi-autobiographical one-man theater show, Klass Klown (later renamed Ghetto Klown), based on his memoir Pimps, Hos, Playa Hatas, and All the Rest of My Hollywood Friends: My Life. After the show ran at various theaters in the United States and Leguizamo performed an "unplugged" version of it under the title John Leguizamo Warms Up at a Chicago theater, it opened on Broadway in March 2011 at the Lyceum Theatre. The show, about Leguizamo's path from obscurity to stardom, opened to many positive reviews and was extended through July 10, 2011. A CD of the show was released. In 2011, Leguizamo received the Outer Critics Circle Award for Outstanding Solo Performance and the Drama Desk Award for Outstanding Solo Performance for his performance in the show. In September 2011, Leguizamo began an international tour of Ghetto Klown in Los Angeles. On July 13, 2012, PBS debuted Tales From a Ghetto Klown, a documentary about Leguizamo's life and the show's development. On November 16, 2013, John taped Ghetto Klown at The New Jersey Performing Arts Center in Newark, NJ for HBO.

In 2016, he produced the Q Brothers' Othello: The Remix at off-Broadway's Westside Theatre.

In 2017, he debuted Latin History for Morons, a show about the participation of Latin Americans throughout US history. The show premiered at the Public Theater before moving to Studio 54. Latin History for Morons was nominated for the 2018 Tony Award for Best Play. That year, he also was presented with a Special Tony Award for his body of work and for his commitment to bringing diverse stories and audiences to Broadway for three decades.

In January 2018, Leguizamo was announced as the host of the 63rd Annual Obie Awards held in May 2018 at Terminal 5. He will be awarded an Honorary Degree from Marymount Manhattan College.

Leguizamo wrote the original musical Kiss My Aztec, with book by Leguizamo and director Tony Taccone, music by Benjamin Velez, and lyrics by Velez, Leguizamo, and David Kamp. It was developed at the Public Theater in 2018 and premiered at Berkeley Repertory Theater and La Jolla Playhouse in 2019, where it received critical acclaim.

Leguizamo also received Smithsonian Magazine's 2018 American Ingenuity Award in the History category.

In 2021, he played Estragon opposite Ethan Hawke as Vladimir in Waiting for Godot and Wallace Shawn with The New Group Off Stage as a video performance during the Covid-19 pandemic.

On record
In 2001, RCA/BMG Records released John Leguizamo LIVE, a CD compilation of Leguizamo's stage routines. Among the bits are a primer Leguizamo gives on the history and culture of Latinos in America, which with the dubious tale of the mating of an Inca princess with a Spanish conquistador, thus creating the original dysfunctional Latin family, each member of which is voiced by Leguizamo. The CD also includes a musical intermission, with two salsa/hip-hop tunes, "The Night Before Christmas" and "Gotta Get Some", and footage from Leguizamo's tours and two interactive games, "Spanish Fly Pick-Up Line".

In late 2017, Leguizamo sang on "Almost Like Praying", a charitable written and composed by Lin-Manuel Miranda. Proceeds from the song went to the Hispanic Federation to assist relief efforts for those in Puerto Rico who were affected by Hurricane Maria.

Books

In October 2006, Leguizamo's memoir, Pimps, Hos, Playa Hatas and All the Rest of My Hollywood Friends: My Life, was released. During an interview on Late Night with Conan O'Brien, he stated that his memoir was very candid about experiences involving other celebrities he had worked with. He stated that working with Arnold Schwarzenegger on Collateral Damage (2002) was one of the most enjoyable experiences he'd had as an actor, that Schwarzenegger's accent let him say things that others would think were sexist or homophobic if said by someone else, that Steven Seagal was an egotist with diva tendencies

In 2015, Abrams ComicArts published the graphic novel adaptation of Leguizamo's one-man Broadway show, Ghetto Klown. As with the live show, the graphic novel explores the actor/comedian's life and career, beginning with his adolescence in Queens, New York, his involvement in 1980s avant-garde theater, his feature film career, and some of the colorful characters he encountered throughout his life. Leguizamo describes the work: "Ghetto Klown is the history that I probably never should have told anyone but my therapist, but it's a real lesson that even if you suffer a certain amount (a lot) of self-doubt and anxiety, you can still accomplish great things. It's a lesson I'm really excited to impart to a whole new audience." The comic is illustrated by Christa Cassano.

Personal life
Leguizamo married actress Yelba Osorio in 1994 and divorced in 1996 after two years of marriage.

He married Justine Maurer, a costumer on Carlito's Way, on June 28, 2003. Leguizamo is Catholic and Maurer is Jewish. They have two children, daughter Allegra Sky Leguizamo (born 1999) and son Ryder Lee "Lucas" Leguizamo (born 2000).
 They live in Manhattan.

In 2008, Leguizamo received the Rita Moreno HOLA Award for Excellence from the Hispanic Organization of Latin Actors (HOLA). In 2011, he received the Made in NY Award from New York City.

In 2018, Leguizamo received an Honorary Degree from Marymount Manhattan College.

Activism
In 2004, Leguizamo was one of the celebrity supporters of Voto Latino, co-founded by Rosario Dawson. In 2012, he co-founded NGL (Next-Generation Latinx) Collective to create content for Latinx audiences. Backed by GoDigital Media Group, in 2022 NGL merged with mitú “to create the largest digital-first “Latinx powerhouse” in the US”. Leguizamo has also been heralded as a preservationist for the Greenwich Village Society for Historic Preservation.

In 2016, Leguizamo authored a searing op-ed in The New York Times, calling out Donald Trump’s “racist rhetoric” and urging Latinos to vote. As of 2022, he is on the Board of Directors for the National Museum of the American Latino. In 2022, he spoke out against whitewashing in the casting of Hollywood movies.

Leguizamo has also been an activist directly through his artistic work. In 2017, he opened Latin History for Morons at The Public, and it later went to Broadway. Netflix filmed it in 2018, advocating that “teaching Latin history is the first step toward conquering prejudice”. In 2020, Leguizamo’s directorial debut, Critical Thinking, was released. He starred in the biographical drama set in 1998 about an inner-city teacher and students who compete in the US National Chess Championship. He said that he wanted to “ create a universal message of hope and spread this message to the world.” In 2022, he performed Ghetto Klown "at Rikers Island Correctional Facility for an audience of justice-involved young men”.

Filmography

Discography

Charted songs

References

External links

 
 
 
 
 

1960 births
Living people
American male film actors
American male stage actors
American male television actors
American male video game actors
American male voice actors
American stand-up comedians
Audiobook narrators
Catholics from New York (state)
Colombian emigrants to the United States
Drama Desk Award winners
Hispanic and Latino American dramatists and playwrights
Hispanic and Latino American male actors
Lee Strasberg Theatre and Film Institute alumni
Long Island University alumni
Male actors from Bogotá
Male actors from New York City
Murry Bergtraum High School alumni
Obie Award recipients
Primetime Emmy Award winners
People from Jackson Heights, Queens
RCA Records artists
Special Tony Award recipients
Tisch School of the Arts alumni
20th-century American comedians
21st-century American comedians
20th-century American dramatists and playwrights
20th-century American male actors
21st-century American male actors